Wanakuni (Aymara wanaku, wanaqu guanaco, -ni a suffix to indicate ownership, "the one with the guanaco", Hispanicized spelling Huanacune) is a mountain in the northern extensions of the Apolobamba mountain range in Peru, about  high. It is situated in the Puno Region, Sandia Province, Quiaca District. Wanakuni lies northeast of Rit'ipata and Chapi.

References 

Mountains of Puno Region
Mountains of Peru